Kienast is a surname. Notable people with the surname include:
 Alain Kienast also known as Alain Souchon (born 1944), a French singer and actor
 Brigitte Kienast, Swiss curler
 Reinhard Kienast (born 1959), an Austrian footballer, uncle of Roman
 Roman Kienast (born 1984), an Austrian footballer, nephew of Reinhard